Reinhold Sendker (born 24 October 1952) is a German politician of the Christian Democratic Union (CDU) who has been serving as a member of the Bundestag from the state of North Rhine-Westphalia since 2009.

Political career 
Sendke became a member of the Bundestag in the 2009 German federal election. He is a member of the Committee on Transport and Digital Infrastructure.

Other activities 
 Federal Network Agency for Electricity, Gas, Telecommunications, Posts and Railway (BNetzA), Alternate Member of the Rail Infrastructure Advisory Council

References

External links 

  
 Bundestag biography 

1952 births
Living people
Members of the Bundestag for North Rhine-Westphalia
Members of the Bundestag 2017–2021
Members of the Bundestag 2013–2017
Members of the Bundestag 2009–2013
Members of the Bundestag for the Christian Democratic Union of Germany